The Shrine of the Most Blessed Sacrament of Our Lady of the Angels Monastery, informally known as OLAM Shrine, is a prominent Roman Catholic Latin Rite shrine located in Hanceville, Alabama, United States within the Diocese of Birmingham. Adjacent is the cloistered Monastery of the Poor Clare Nuns of Perpetual Adoration, situated on a  site and a religious center affiliated with the Eternal Word Television Network.

The Shrine is notable for its gilt interior, solemn atmosphere, and  monstrance. The Shrine is named in honor of the Most Blessed Sacrament, while the building surroundings are dedicated to the Divino Niño, a title of the Child Jesus found prominently displayed all over the area. Its foundress, Mother Mary Angelica of the Annunciation, resided at the cloistered monastery with her nuns until her death in 2016.

History

In 1995, while travelling to Colombia to seek assistance for EWTN's Spanish-language programs, Mother Angelica attended Mass at the Sanctuary of the Divine Child Jesus in Bogotá and was inspired to build a shrine honoring the real presence of Christ in the Eucharist. Five anonymous benefactors contributed to the purchase of a  former soybean farm located in Hanceville, Alabama, and to construction costs and materials. The monastery was consecrated in December 1999.

Description

The exterior is characteristic Romanesque, but incorporates pointed arches and other Gothic elements.
Mother Angelica sought to model the Shrine on 13th century Italian architecture, with its piazza or plaza square, colonnade, esplanade and various cosmatesque designs. She also wanted the building to reflect materials from all over the world. The ceramic tile came from South America. The bronze doors depicting the Seven Joys and Seven Sorrows of Mary were designed and crafted in Spain. The floors, columns, and pillars are made of marble. The rare red Jasper marble is from Turkey. The wood for the pews, doors, and confessionals is cedar imported from Paraguay. Spanish workers came to build the doors. The stained glass windows were imported from Munich, Germany. The stations of the Cross inside are hand-carved.

A statue of El Divino Niño is featured prominently one on the side altars of the Shrine, as well as a large statue of the Child Jesus, holding a heart at His palm, stands at the plaza square. On the liturgical feast day of Divine Child Jesus, balloons are customarily tied to his wrist for this feast.

The Shrine consists of a Cloistered Monastery, Upper and Lower church, near life sized Nativity scene, Lourdes Grotto, Castle which houses the gift shop and conference rooms, and John Paul II Eucharistic Center (open for tours Mon-Sat 10AM and 2PM). A large ornate screen behind the High Altar divides the shrine between where the Poor Clare Nuns worship in cloister and where the faithful worship.

During construction, a storm struck the area, causing the church cross to be damaged. Initially, Mother Angelica wanted to repair it. Later on, Mother Angelica associated the cross with the Tau cross. The damaged remains of the top part of the cross are on display in the St. Joseph Courtyard. Another notable statue in the Shrine depicts a scourged Jesus Christ, symbolic of his pain and suffering at the cross.

Pilgrimages 
People from all over the world make pilgrimages to the Shrine of the Most Blessed Sacrament. Pilgrimages consist of individuals or groups.

References

External links
 Official website
 Shrine of the Most Blessed Sacrament, Granda Liturgical Arts - description of church interior

Convents in the United States
Roman Catholic churches in Alabama
Churches in Cullman County, Alabama
Roman Catholic churches completed in 1999
Christian organizations established in 1999
1999 establishments in Alabama
20th-century Roman Catholic church buildings in the United States